The ceremonial county of Northamptonshire is divided into two unitary authorities West Northamptonshire and North Northamptonshire.  Up until 31 March 2021, Northamptonshire was divided into seven districts. The former districts of Northamptonshire were South Northamptonshire, Northampton, Daventry, Wellingborough, Kettering, Corby, and East Northamptonshire.

As there are 368 Grade II* listed buildings in the county they have been split into separate lists for each former district.

 Grade II* listed buildings in Corby
 Grade II* listed buildings in Daventry (district)
 Grade II* listed buildings in East Northamptonshire
 Grade II* listed buildings in Kettering (borough)
 Grade II* listed buildings in Northampton
 Grade II* listed buildings in South Northamptonshire
 Grade II* listed buildings in Wellingborough (borough)

See also
 Grade I listed buildings in Northamptonshire
 :Category:Grade II* listed buildings in Northamptonshire

References
National Heritage List for England

 
Northamptonshire